Melanopsis etrusca is a species of freshwater snail in the family Melanopsidae. It is endemic to southern Italy, where it is found in hot springs. Today it is known from only four locations and its populations are decreasing. It is threatened by the draining of its hot spring habitat.

References

Melanopsidae
Endemic fauna of Italy
Gastropods described in 1862
Taxonomy articles created by Polbot